Zhejiang Zhoushan High School is a public secondary school in Zhoushan, Zhejiang.

As of March 2023, Zhoushan High School has approximately 1500 students and 180 teachers. The public school established a private Sino-American high school program to prepare students for admission to top-tier universities in the United States, Great Britain, and Australia. Southlands Christian Schools has a partnership with Zhoushan High School that involves training and supervising foreign teachers according to the standards of the State of California. David Metz of The New York Times described it as "Zhoushan’s most elite high school".

The campus includes a planetarium and has a capacity of 1,500. It includes boarding facilities.

References

External links
 Zhejiang Zhoushan High School
 

Secondary schools in China
Education in Zhejiang
Boarding schools in China